Guy Bois (25 December 1934 – 8 June 2019) was a French Marxist historian. He was noted for his contributions to the history of feudalism, which have been widely translated.

Biography
Bois was professor of medieval history at the Université de Paris-I (in 1989) and the Université de Franche-Comté (in 1990), and president of the Société d'étude du féodalisme (also in 1990). He died on 8 June 2019, aged 84.

Works
 Bois, Guy, The Crisis of Feudalism: Economy and Society in Eastern Normandy c.1300-1550 (Cambridge: Cambridge University Press; Paris: Editions de la Maison des Sciences de l'Homme, 1984),  (trans. from Crise du féodalisme, Références (Presses de la Fondation nationale des sciences politiques), 2 (Paris: Presses de la Fondation nationale des sciences politiques, 1981),  [first edn. Crise du féodalisme: économie rurale et démographie en Normandie orientale du début du 14e siècle au milieu du 16e siècle, Cahiers de la Fondation nationale des sciences politiques, 202 (Paris: Presses de la Fondation nationale des sciences politiques, 1976))
 Bois, Guy, The Transformation of the Year One Thousand: The Village of Lournand from Antiquity to Feudalism, trans. by Jean Birrell (Manchester: Manchester University Press, 1992), 071903566X (pbk) (trans. from La mutation de l'an mil. Lournand, village mâconnais de l'Antiquité au féodalisme (París, Fayard, 1989))
 Bois, Guy, La grande dépression médiévale: XIVe-XVe siècles: le précédent d'une crise systémique (Paris: Presses Universitaires de France, 2000), 
 Bois, Guy, Une nouvelle servitude: essai sur la mondialisation (François-Xavier de Guibert, 2003),

References

1934 births
2019 deaths
Historians of France
French medievalists
20th-century French historians
French male non-fiction writers